Alex Baumann (born 9 March 1985) is a Swiss bobsledder who has competed since 2007. His first World Cup victory came on 13 November 2009 in the two-man event at Utah Olympic Park in Park City.

At the 2014 Olympics Baumann won a silver medal in doubles, together with Beat Hefti, and finished in eighth place in the four-man event.

References

External links

1985 births
Living people
Swiss male bobsledders
Bobsledders at the 2014 Winter Olympics
Olympic bobsledders of Switzerland
Medalists at the 2014 Winter Olympics
Olympic medalists in bobsleigh
Olympic gold medalists for Switzerland
People from Appenzell Ausserrhoden
21st-century Swiss people